Nicholas Thomas "Nicky" Walker (born 8 September 1994) is an English semi-professional footballer who plays as a winger for Liversedge.

He has previously played for Rotherham United, Barrow, Wycombe Wanderers, Grimsby Town and Shaw Lane.

Career

Rotherham United
Walker started his career with Rotherham United, starting a two-year scholarship with the club in the summer of 2011. He made his professional debut whilst still a youth player on 17 November 2012, in a 4–2 win over Cheltenham Town in League Two, replacing Courtney Cameron as a substitute. Soon after, Walker was soon linked with many Championship clubs keen to sign him.

At the 2012–13 season, Walker signed his first professional contract at the club. Shortly after, Walker switched number shirt from thirty-two to twenty-nine.

On 25 October 2013, Walker joined Conference North side Barrow a one-month loan deal. Following his loan spell at Barrow came to an end, Walker contract with Rotherham United was extended for another season.

On 31 July 2014, Walker joined League Two side Wycombe Wanderers on loan for three months, along with teammate Daniel Rowe. However, Walker didn't start first team place at Wycombe Wanderers and stayed at the club until his loan came to an end.

On 28 November 2014 it was announced that Walker had joined Conference Premier side Grimsby Town on loan until January 2015.

Boston United
On 1 January 2015 after making no appearances on loan at Grimsby Town, he was released by Rotherham United, he joined Conference North side Boston United on a free transfer.

Gainsborough Trinity
On 28 February 2018 Walker signed for Gainsborough Trinity of the National League North. He made his debut on 10 March, scoring a 94th-minute winner against Kidderminster Harriers.

Northern Premier League
In June 2022, following a title-winning campaign with Liversedge, Walker joined Whitby Town. In September, he signed for Guiseley before returning to Liversedge for an undisclosed fee in December.

Career statistics

References

External links

1994 births
Living people
Footballers from Rotherham
English footballers
Association football midfielders
Rotherham United F.C. players
Wycombe Wanderers F.C. players
Grimsby Town F.C. players
Boston United F.C. players
Shaw Lane A.F.C. players
Gainsborough Trinity F.C. players
Buxton F.C. players
Alfreton Town F.C. players
Liversedge F.C. players
Whitby Town F.C. players
Guiseley A.F.C. players
English Football League players
Northern Football League players